Svetla Ivanova Mitkova-Sınırtaş (born June 17, 1964 in Medovo, Bulgaria) is a retired athlete who competed in shot put and discus throw. She represented her home country Bulgaria up to 1999, when she gained a Turkish citizenship by marriage. She competed in every World Championship from the inaugural 1983 edition to 1999, the highlight being a bronze medal in 1995. Her personal best results, 20.91 in shot put and 69.72 in discus, were both set in Sofia in 1987.

Achievements

Discus throw

Shot put

Results with a (q), indicate overall position in qualifying round.

External links

sports-reference

1964 births
Living people
Bulgarian female shot putters
Bulgarian female discus throwers
Athletes (track and field) at the 1988 Summer Olympics
Athletes (track and field) at the 1992 Summer Olympics
Athletes (track and field) at the 1996 Summer Olympics
Olympic athletes of Bulgaria
Turkish female discus throwers
Turkish female shot putters
Turkish people of Bulgarian descent
Bulgarian people of Turkish descent
Bulgarian emigrants to Turkey
Naturalized citizens of Turkey
World Athletics Championships medalists
European Athletics Championships medalists
Goodwill Games medalists in athletics
Competitors at the 1994 Goodwill Games